Shakerley Mere is a lake and recreation area near Allostock, Cheshire, England. The mere is a former sand quarry, which flooded after extraction ended in the 1960s. Roughly triangular in shape, it bounded to the east by the M6 motorway and on the other two sides by the B5081 and B5082 roads. The site is managed for recreation by Cheshire West and Chester Council.

The fishing rights are leased by Lymm Angling Club (the lake is stocked with carp, bream, roach and perch). In 2014 a small number of introduced bighead and silver carp were removed from the water.

See also

List of parks and open spaces in Cheshire
Astbury Mere, another Cheshire mere that originated in a sand quarry

References

Parks and open spaces in Cheshire
Forests and woodlands of Cheshire
Lakes and reservoirs of Cheshire